The Aliens Control Act No 40 of 1973 of South Africa led to the exemption of the racial group of Indians from the need to obtain permits for travel between provinces. However, in terms of provincial legislation at the time, Indians were not allowed to stay in the Orange Free State and parts of northern Natal for more than a brief period unless prior permission had been obtained.

Repeal
The laws prohibiting Indians from residing in the Orange Free State and northern Natal, from which the Aliens Control Act had granted an exemption, were themselves repealed in 1986. The act was repealed by section 60 of the Aliens Control Act, 1991.

References

Apartheid laws in South Africa
1973 in South African law